Revenge is an American psychological thriller television series that premiered on ABC on September 21, 2011. The series was created by Mike Kelley and is inspired by the Alexandre Dumas novel The Count of Monte Cristo. The series stars Madeleine Stowe and Emily VanCamp.

On April 29, 2015, ABC announced the cancellation of the series after four seasons. The final episode aired on May 10, 2015.

Series overview

Episodes

Season 1 (2011–12)

Season 2 (2012–13)

Season 3 (2013–14)

Season 4 (2014–15)

Specials

Ratings

Home media release

References

External links 
 
 

List
Revenge